Noel Hazard (born 19 February 1936) is an Australian boxer. He competed in the men's featherweight event at the 1956 Summer Olympics. At the 1956 Summer Olympics, he lost to Thomas Nicholls of Great Britain.

References

1936 births
Living people
Australian male boxers
Olympic boxers of Australia
Boxers at the 1956 Summer Olympics
Place of birth missing (living people)
Featherweight boxers